The 2017 Men's EuroHockey Championship II was the seventh edition of the EuroHockey Championship II, the second level of the European field hockey championships. It was held from the 6th to the 12th of August 2019 in Glasgow, Scotland. The tournament also served as a direct qualifier for the 2019 Men's EuroHockey Nations Championship, with the winner Scotland and runner-up Wales qualifying.

Qualified teams
The following eight teams, shown with pre-tournament world rankings, competed in the tournament.

Format
The eight teams were split into two groups of four teams. The top two teams of each pool advanced to the semi-finals to determine the winner in a knockout system. The bottom two teams from each pool played in a new group with the teams they did not play against in the group stage. The last two teams were relegated to the EuroHockey Championship III.

Results
''All times are local (UTC+0).

Preliminary round

Pool A

Pool B

Fifth to eighth place classification

Pool C
The points obtained in the preliminary round against the other team are taken over.

First to fourth place classification

Semi-finals

Third and fourth place

Final

Final standings

 Qualified for the 2019 EuroHockey Championship

 Relegated to the EuroHockey Championship III

Notes

References

External links
FIH results page

EuroHockey Championship II
Men 2
EuroHockey Championship II Men
2010s in Glasgow
International sports competitions in Glasgow
International field hockey competitions hosted by Scotland
EuroHockey Championship II Men